Thanatophobia is the fear of death, more specifically being dead or dying.

Thanatophobia may also refer to:

"Thanatophobia" (Æon Flux), an episode of the Æon Flux TV series
"Thanatophobia ", a song by Funker Vogt from the 2009 album Warzone K17